Super Speed is a 1925 American silent comedy film directed by Al Rogell and starring Reed Howes and Mildred Harris.

Plot
As described in a review in a film magazine, working as a driver for his uncle who owns a big milk company, Pat O'Farrell (Howes) saves Claire Knight (Harris) from some thugs, and it is a case of love at first sight. Pat finds that crooked lawyer Stanton Wade (Lewis) plans to steal an invention, a supercharger from his old friend Dad Perkins (Williams) and manages to get it after a running fight and chase over the rooftops with Wade's henchmen. 0claire, still believing him to be a milkman, invites him to a party. He comes all dressed up and tells her the truth. She confides that her father is deeply in debt to Wade. Pat sees a chance to win, and equips one of the cars, a Knight Hawk manufactured by Claire's father, with the supercharger and drive it in the race. Wade's thugs capture him, but he gets away in time and wins the race. Rushing to Wade's office, he arrives in time to prevent the company being signed over to Wade. Incidentally, he also wins the young woman.

Cast

Preservation
A print of Super Speed is located at the Library of Congress.

References

External links

1925 films
American silent feature films
Films based on short fiction
1925 comedy films
American auto racing films
Silent American comedy films
American black-and-white films
Rayart Pictures films
Films with screenplays by John Grey
1920s English-language films
1920s American films